Julian Fellowes Investigates: A Most Mysterious Murder is a British five-part docudrama series produced by Touchpaper Television (part of the RDF Media Group), which premièred on BBC One on 16 October 2004.

Overview
The series presents dramatised accounts of five distinct unsolved murders from British history. Actor and Academy Award-winning screenwriter Julian Fellowes appears as a "historical detective," who guides the audience through the events leading up to the murder, and proposes a solution to each case.

Fellowes presents and narrates each episode, sometimes walking into the action to explain a point. He appears again at the end to conclude the case, putting forward his theory on the identity and motivation of the murderer.

Fellowes co-wrote all five episodes of the series.

Episode notes

The Case of Charles Bravo
The Case of Charles Bravo was a pilot for a proposed series and was originally broadcast under the title A Most Mysterious Murder: The Case of Charles Bravo. The overarching title Julian Fellowes Investigates: A Most Mysterious Murder accompanied each subsequent episode.

Fellowes described his solution to the murder of Charles Bravo as: "surprising...there is definitely a sting in the tail. My wife and son both said I got it wrong. I want the viewers to decide."

The Case of the Croydon Poisonings
The Case of the Croydon Poisonings was filmed in some of the houses in the location of the original murders. Producers researched the case using old newspaper articles, and also talked to people who were in Croydon at the time.

Episode list

Reception
Reviewing The Case of Rose Harsent, The Stage'''s Harry Venning commented that: "What makes the show more than just a costumed Crimewatch is the quality of the drama at its heart. The period is beautifully evoked, real effort is made to create characters that are more than just a parade of Cluedo cut-outs and the performances are excellent." He added: "There is a disappointing absence of modern policing methods or forensic science in the process, with Fellowes drawing conclusions based on guesswork and speculation." Sam Wollaston in The Guardian was critical of the Suffolk accents in the episode but described it as: "Quite good fun – like a cross between Crimewatch and Midsomer Murders."

See alsoMurder, Mystery and My FamilySecond Verdict''

References

External links
 
 
 
 
 
 The Case of Charles Bravo film-page

2000s British drama television series
2004 British television series debuts
BBC television docudramas
2005 British television series endings
English-language television shows
2000s British mystery television series
Television series created by Julian Fellowes